Fawn Township is a township in Allegheny County, Pennsylvania, United States. The population was 2,193 at the 2020 census. The township derives its name either directly after Fahan, County Donegal, Ireland, by Irish settlers of which 'fawn' is the phonetic pronunciation, or indirectly from the York County township of that name with name origin. According to the township itself, Fawn Township derived its name from its parent township, Deer Township, from which it was formed 28 March 1858.

Geography

Surrounding neighborhoods
Fawn Township has five borders: with Buffalo Township in Butler County to the north, Harrison Township to the east, Tarentum to the south, Frazer Township to the southwest and West Deer Township to the west.

Streams
 Bull Creek runs through Fawn Township.
 McDowell Run joins Bull Creek near the intersection of Bull Creek Road and Howes Run Road in Fawn Township.
 Lardintown Run joins Bull Creek near the intersection of Bull Creek Road and Lardintown Road in Fawn Township.
 Little Bull Creek runs through Fawn Township.

Demographics

As of the census of 2000, there were 2,504 people, 985 households, and 750 families residing in the township. The population density was 193.8 people per square mile (74.8/km). There were 1,031 housing units at an average density of 79.8/sq mi (30.8/km). The racial makeup of the township was 98.72% White, 0.20% African American, 0.04% Native American, 0.68% Asian, 0.04% Pacific Islander, 0.08% from other races, and 0.24% from two or more races. Hispanic or Latino of any race were 0.24% of the population.

Ancestry was reported as 27% German, 13% Irish, 11% Slovak and 10% Polish.

There were 985 households, out of which 29.8% had children under the age of 18 living with them, 65.5% were married couples living together, 7.2% had a female householder with no husband present, and 23.8% were non-families. 20.6% of all households were made up of individuals, and 10.1% had someone living alone who was 65 years of age or older. The average household size was 2.53 and the average family size was 2.93.

In the township the population was spread out, with 21.0% under the age of 18, 6.5% from 18 to 24, 28.4% from 25 to 44, 26.6% from 45 to 64, and 17.6% who were 65 years of age or older. The median age was 42 years. For every 100 females, there were 101.4 males. For every 100 females age 18 and over, there were 99.8 males.

The median income for a household in the township was $37,102, and the median income for a family was $45,114. Males had a median income of $38,884 versus $22,041 for females. The per capita income for the township was $18,566. About 4.6% of families and 6.4% of the population were below the poverty line, including 5.8% of those under age 18 and 10.1% of those age 65 or over.

Education
Fawn Township is within the Highlands School District, which operates Fawn Primary Center (K–2), formerly Fawn Elementary School (K–5), along Ridge Road. The mailing address for the school is Natrona Heights.

Government and Politics

Usage in popular culture

The film Knightriders (1981) by George A. Romero, starring Ed Harris, used scenes shot in Fawn Township (1980) for the movie.

My Bloody Valentine 3D (2009) was filmed on location at the Fawn Tavern on Bull Creek Road and The Tour Ed Mine on Ridge Road.

References

External links
Fawn Township website

Pittsburgh metropolitan area
Townships in Allegheny County, Pennsylvania
Townships in Pennsylvania